All wings of the Indian Armed Forces have women in combat roles. Women are allowed in combat services and supervisory roles (as officers). Indian Air Force had 13.09% and 8.50%, Indian Navy 6% and 3% women, and Indian Army 3.80% and 3% in December 2018 and December 2014 respectively.

As of 2020, three officers have been granted the rank of lieutenant general or equivalent, all of whom are from the Medical Services. In May 2021, 83 Women were inducted as Jawans for the first time in the Indian Army, the Jawans were taken in the Corps of Military Police.

History
In 1888, the role of women in the Indian army began when the "Indian Military Nursing Service" was formed during the British Rule. During 1914–45, British Indian Army nurses fought in World War I (1914–18) and World War II (1939-45), where 350 British Indian Army nurses either died or were taken prisoner of war or declared missing in action. This includes nurses who died when SS Kuala was sunk by the Japanese bombers in February 1942. Women's Auxiliary Corps (India) was formed in May 1942. Noor Inayat Khan, George Cross (2 January 1914 – 13 September 1944), of Indian and American descent, was a British heroine of World War II renowned for her service in the Special Operations Executive. Kalyani Sen, a second officer and first Indian service woman who visited the UK, served in the Women's Royal Indian Naval Service of the Royal Indian Navy during World War II. There was a woman's regiment under Netaji Subhash Chandra Bose 's Indian National Army called the Rani of Jhansi Regiment was one of that kind during World War II.

In 2021, the National Defence Academy entrance exam was opened up to female cadets.

Indian Army

Summary table of commission by corps

Under the Army Act of 1950, women were ineligible for regular commissions except in "such corps, departments or branches which the central government may specify by way of notifications." On 1 November 1958, the Army Medical Corps became the first unit of the Indian Army to grant regular commissions to women. Since 1992, women were first inducted in to various branches of Indian Army only in short service commission. In 2008, women were first inducted as permanent commissioned officers in Legal and Education corps, in 2020 they were first inducted in 8 more corps as permanent commissioned officers. As of 2020, women are not yet allowed as combatant in the Parachute Regiment of Indian Army or other specialist forces, but they can join paratroopers wings of their respective arms like para EME, para signals, para ASC, etc.

Here is the status of women's induction in various branches of army in any role as well as in coveted permanent commissioned officers role.

Notable women

As of 2020, women are not allowed to serve in combat units such as Infantry, Mechanised infantry, Armoured corps, and Artillery.

On 27 August 1976, Gertrude Alice Ram, the military nursing service Matron-in-Chief, became the first woman officer in the Indian Army to attain the rank of Major General, and the first female officer in the Indian Armed Forces to attain two-star rank. With Ram's promotion, India became only the third nation in the world to promote a woman to flag rank, behind the United States and France.

In 1992, the Indian Army began inducting women officers in non-medical roles. On 19 January 2007, the United Nations first all female peacekeeping force made up of 105 Indian policewomen was deployed to Liberia. Ruchi Sharma became the first operational paratrooper in the Indian Army, joining in 1996.

Priya Jhingan, commissioned in 1993, is one of the first 25 women to join the Indian Army as an officer. Alka Khurana, also commissioned in 1993, is the first woman from Indian Army to participate in Republic Day Parade and Army Day Parade in 1994. Sapper Shanti Tigga was the first female jawan (private rank) in the Indian Army who joined in 2011. Priya Semwal's husband had fallen in a counter-insurgency operation in Arunachal Pradesh in 2012; she went onto join as an officer in the Indian Army Corps of EME, the first wife of a jawan whose husband had fallen in a counter-insurgency operation to do so.

Lieutenant Colonel Mitali Madhumita, commissioned in 2000, is the first woman officer in India to receive a gallantry award, who received the Sena Medal in 2011 for exemplary courage shown during the attack on the Indian embassy in Kabul by terrorists in Kabul, Afghanistan on 26 February 2010, and operations in Jammu-Kashmir and the northeast states.

Anjana Bhaduria, who joined the first-ever batch of female cadets in 1992 at the Officers Training Academy, Chennai, is the first female officer in the Indian Army to win the gold medal. Including Priya Jhingan and her, the first batch of women officers of the Indian Army was commissioned in March 1993. Divya Ajith Kumar, commissioned in 2010, is the first female officer to receive the Sword of Honor. She led all women contingent of 154 women officers and cadets during the Republic Day parade of 2015.

Captain Swati Singh, an engineer and then only female officer in her 63 Brigade of the Indian Army, is the first female officer to be deployed at Nathu La pass as Signals in-charge. In February 2020 Madhuri Kanitkar became the third woman to become a Lieutenant General in the Indian Army. Along with her husband who is also a Lieutenant General they will be the first couple to both reach the rank.

On 17 February 2020, the Supreme Court of India said that women officers in Indian Army can get command positions at par with male officers. The court said that the government's arguments against it were discriminatory, disturbing and based on stereotype. The court also said that permanent commission should be available to all women, regardless of years of service, and that this order must be implemented in 3 months. The government had earlier said troops would not accept women as commanding officers. Consequently, 8 more corps or branches started to induct women as commissioned officers.

Ganeve Lalji, Corps of Military intelligence, is the first woman to be an Aide de camp to an Army Commander (Lieutenant General).

Indian Air Force

Indian Air Force inducts women in all roles, including combat and support roles. As of September 2020, there were 1,875 female officers serving in the IAF, including 10 pilots and 18 navigators.

The first woman officer in the Indian Air Force, Vijayalakshmi Ramanan, was commissioned into the Army Medical Corps and was seconded to the Air Force. She retired as a Wing Commander in the Air Force in 1979.

In August 1966, Flight Lieutenant Kanta Handa, an IAF medical officer, became the first female IAF officer to receive a commendation for her service during the 1965 Indo-Pakistan war. In 1994, women joined the air force as pilots in support role; Gunjan Saxena and Sreevidya Rajan were among the first women to fly in a combat zone during Kargil War (May–July 1999).

In 2006, Deepika Misra, a Brahman was the first IAF woman pilot to train for the Sarang display team. In 2012, Nivedita Singh (Flight Lieutenant) from Rajasthan, became the first woman from the Indian Air Force to summit the Mount Everest.

In 2015, Indian Air Force opened new combat air force roles for women as fighter pilots, adding to their role as helicopter pilots in the Indian Air Force. 
On 22 May 2019, Bhawana Kanth became the first woman fighter pilot to qualify to undertake combat missions.
Women are now taking up combat roles in Indian Air Force with Avani Chaturvedi, Mohana Singh Jitarwal, and Bhawana Kanth being the first 3 women fighter pilots Marking International Women's Day on 8 March 8, 2020 all 3 fighter pilots were awarded Nari Shakti Puraskar.

Wing Commander Shaliza Dhami became the first woman officer to be given permanent commission with the Indian Air Force. Squadron Leader Minty Agarwal became the first woman to receive a Yudh Seva Medal.

Indian Navy

In October 1976, Dr. Barbara Ghosh became the first woman officer in the Indian Navy to attain the rank of commander. Having joined the navy in 1961, she was also the first woman medical officer to receive a permanent naval commission.

Dr. Punita Arora, commissioned in 1968, is the first woman in the Indian Army to reach the second highest rank, Lieutenant General, and the first female Vice Admiral. Padmavathy Bandopadhyay is the first woman Air Marshal of the IAF and the second woman in the Indian armed forces to be promoted to a three-star rank after Lt. General Punita Arora. Nonetheless, the Indian Navy still opposes the idea of putting women in warships as sailors or officers, even though women fly on maritime patrol aircraft like P8I and IL 38.

On 8 March 2018, International Women's Day the six-member crew of INSV Tarini that participated in Navika Sagar Parikrama namely Lt Cdr Vartika Joshi, Lt Cdr P. Swathi, Lt Cdr Pratibha Jammwal, Lt Payal Gupta, Lt Aishwarya Boddapati, and Lt Shourgrakpam Vijaya Devi were conferred Nari Shakti Puraskar for outstanding contribution towards women empowerment. The award was received by Lieutenant Shourgrakpam Vijaya Devi, who is Northeast India's first female officer on behalf of team.

On 2 December 2019, Sub-lieutenant Shubhangi Swaroop became the first woman pilot for the Indian Navy. She will be flying the Dornier 228 surveillance aircraft.

On 26 August 2021, Surgeon Vice Admiral Sheila S. Mathai became the fourth woman to be promoted to three-star rank and the first direct navy woman vice-admiral.

Special Forces of India

As of 2020, Women are not yet allowed as combatant in the combat specialist forces, such as Ghatak Force, Garud Commando Force, MARCOS, para commandos, etc.

Dr. Seema Rao, also known as "India's Wonder Woman", is India's first woman commando trainer, having trained over 15,000 Special Forces of India (including the NSG, MARCOS, GARUD) as full-time guest trainer for 20 years without compensation as a pioneer in close quarter battle (CQB).

Paramilitary forces of India

Women in Indian Coast Guard, Assam Rifles and Special Frontier Force.

Indian Coast Guard
Women can join the Indian Coast Guard in officer ranks as general duty, pilot or law officers. In January 2017, Indian Coast Guard became the first force to deploy four female officers, assistant commandants Anuradha Shukla, Sneha Kathayat, Shirin Chandran and Vasundhara Chouksey, in combat roles on board KV Kuber hovercraft ship patrolling the Indian maritime zone bordering Pakistan and Bangladesh.

Assam Rifles
In April 2016, Assam Rifles inducted a first batch of 100 female soldiers who had undergone year-long training programme and graduated in the passing-out parade at the Assam Rifles Training Centre and School in Shokhuvi in Chümoukedima District of Nagaland. They will be deployed at Cordon And Search Operation (CASO), Mobile Check Posts (MCP) and road opening operations in various battalions for search, frisking and interrogation of women, crowd control and dispersal of female agitators.

In August 2020, around 30 rifle-women from Assam Rifles were deployed along the LoC for the first time. They are led by Captain Gursimran Kaur of the Army Service Corps.

Special Frontier Force
Special Frontier Force, created in 1962 as a most covert and elite Special Force unit as the armed wing of RAW to conduct covert operations behind the Chinese Lines in the event of another Sino-Indian War, inducted 500 female in 1972 for the first time in medical, signals and clerical roles.

Central Armed Police Forces

In 1992, Asha Sinha, a 1982 Batch IPS Officer, became the First Woman Commandant in the Paramilitary forces of India when she was posted as Commandant, Central Industrial Security Force in Mazagon Dock Shipbuilders Limited and after 34 years of service she retired as Director General of Police (DGP). In 2018 an IPS Officer Archana Ramasundram of 1980 Batch became the First Woman to become the Director General of Police of a Paramilitary Force as DG, Sashastra Seema Bal, she retired after serving for 37 years.

In March 2016, govt allowed direct-entry women officers in all five Central Armed Police Forces, namely Central Reserve Police Force (CRPF), Border Security Force (BSF), Indo-Tibetan Border Police (ITBP), Sashastra Seema Bal (SSB) and Central Industrial Security Force (CISF), allow direct entry to women in junior rank via direct recruitment and also to women officer via Union Public Service Commission in supervisory combat roles. In March 2016, Home Minister Rajnath Singh announced that women will be inducted in 33% constable-rank personnel in CRPF and CISF and 15% in the border guarding forces BSF, SSB and ITBP.

Central Reserve Police Force 

Central Reserve Police Force (CRPF) allows women officers in supervisory combat roles since  a long time via UPSC route.

Central Industrial Security Force 

Central Industrial Security Force (CISF) allows women officers in supervisory combat roles since a long time via UPSC route.

Border Security Force 
Border Security Force (BSF) allowed women officers in supervisory combat roles in 2013.

Sashastra Seema Bal 
Sashastra Seema Bal (SSB) allowed women officers in supervisory combat roles in 2014.

Indo-Tibetan Border Police 
Indo-Tibetan Border Police (ITBP)  allowed women officers in supervisory combat roles in 2016. About 1.75% (1,500) of 80,000 ITBP personnel are women, mostly in the rank of constables (c. March 2016).

Other Forces

Women also serve in the National Security Guard (NSG), Special Protection Group (SPG), Railway Protection Force (RPF), National Disaster Response Force (NDRF) and Border Roads Organisation (BRO).

National Security Guard
National Security Guard (NSG) (Black Cat Commandos) inducted female commandos for the first in 2011–12, however the first discrimination they faced was from the then female Chief Minister, Mayawati who refused to be guarded by the female commandos. In 2015, govt announced that the female NSG Black Cat Commandos, who undergo the same training as their male counterpart, will be deployed in counter-terrorism operations as they also perform VIP protection duties.

Special Protection Group
Special Protection Group (SPG) inducted female commandos in 2013, and then Prime Minister Manmohan Singh's wife Gursharan Kaur became the first SPG protectee to have women commandos.

Railway Protection Force
Railway Protection Force (RPF) has female unit, Shakti Squad. In 2015, 25-year-old Debashmita Chattopadhyay became first female Assistant Security Commissioner (ASC) in RPF who took charge of the Shakti squad of RPF women constables.

National Disaster Response Force
National Disaster Response Force (NDRF) got its first woman commander in 2015 when 40-years old senior Commandant Rekha Nambiar joined the 4th Battalion based in Arakkonam in Tamil Nadu to lead 1,000 personnel-strong all-men battalion.

Border Roads Organisation 
In June 2021, Vaishali Hiwase became the first women commanding officer to command a BRO Road Construction Company part of the India-China Border Roads.

Three star officers
Six women have been promoted to three-star rank in the Indian Armed Forces. All of them are from the Medical Corps and graduate medical doctors of the Armed Forces Medical College (AFMC).

In popular culture 
 Aarohan (1996–97), tele serial showcasing women officers serving in the Indian Navy.
 The Test Case (2017), web series on the fictional story of the first woman training to serve in a combat role within the Indian Armed Forces.
 Gunjan Saxena: The Kargil Girl (2020–21), biographical film starring Janhvi Kapoor as real life Indian Air Force pilot Gunjan Saxena who was the first Indian female airforce pilot in combat.

See also
 Timeline of women in the Indian military and Coast Guard
 Serving generals of the Indian Army
 National Commission for Women
 Welfare schemes for women in India
 Women in agriculture in India
 Women in India
 Women's suffrage in India

References

External links
 Indian Army – Official website
 Indian Air Force - Official website
 Indian Navy - Official website

Military of India
Indian Army
Indian Navy
Indian Air Force
Indian female military personnel
Women in India
Women in 21st-century warfare
Women in warfare post-1945